Sebastian Pereira (born 17 July 1976) is a Brazilian judoka. He competed in the men's lightweight event at the 1996 Summer Olympics.

References

External links
 

1976 births
Living people
Brazilian male judoka
Olympic judoka of Brazil
Judoka at the 1996 Summer Olympics
People from Nova Iguaçu
South American Games gold medalists for Brazil
South American Games medalists in judo
Competitors at the 2002 South American Games
Pan American Games medalists in judo
Pan American Games bronze medalists for Brazil
Judoka at the 1999 Pan American Games
Medalists at the 1999 Pan American Games
Sportspeople from Rio de Janeiro (state)
21st-century Brazilian people
20th-century Brazilian people